

Suborder Adephaga

Note: the family Carabidae (ground beetles), is also part of this suborder; a list of these is at List of ground beetle (Carabidae) species recorded in Britain.

Family Gyrinidae

 Gyrinus aeratus
 Gyrinus caspius
 Gyrinus distinctus
 Gyrinus marinus
 Gyrinus minutus
 Gyrinus natator
 Gyrinus opacus
 Gyrinus paykulli
 Gyrinus substriatus
 Gyrinus suffriani
 Gyrinus urinator
 Orectochilus villosus — hairy whirligig beetle

Family Haliplidae

 Brychius elevatus
 Peltodytes caesus
 Haliplus confinis
 Haliplus obliquus
 Haliplus varius
 Haliplus lineatocollis
 Haliplus apicalis
 Haliplus fluviatilis
 Haliplus furcatus
 Haliplus heydeni
 Haliplus immaculatus
 Haliplus lineolatus
 Haliplus ruficollis
 Haliplus sibiricus
 Haliplus flavicollis
 Haliplus fulvus
 Haliplus laminatus
 Haliplus mucronatus
 Haliplus variegatus

Family Noteridae

 Noterus clavicornis
 Noterus crassicornis

Family Paelobiidae

 Hygrobia hermanni

Family Dytiscidae

Agabus arcticus
Agabus congener
Agabus sturmii
Agabus labiatus
Agabus uliginosus
Agabus undulatus
Agabus affinis
Agabus biguttatus
Agabus bipustulatus
Agabus brunneus
Agabus conspersus
Agabus didymus
Agabus guttatus
Agabus melanarius
Agabus nebulosus
Agabus paludosus
Agabus striolatus
Agabus unguicularis
Ilybius aenescens
Ilybius ater
Ilybius chalconatus
Ilybius fenestratus
Ilybius fuliginosus
Ilybius guttiger
Ilybius montanus
Ilybius quadriguttatus
Ilybius subaeneus
Ilybius wasastjernae
Platambus maculatus
Colymbetes fuscus
Rhantus grapii
Rhantus bistriatus
Rhantus exsoletus
Rhantus frontalis
Rhantus suturalis
Rhantus suturellus
Liopterus haemorrhoidalis
Acilius canaliculatus
Acilius sulcatus
Graphoderus bilineatus
Graphoderus cinereus
Graphoderus zonatus
Cybister lateralimarginalis
Dytiscus circumcinctus
Dytiscus circumflexus
Dytiscus dimidiatus
Dytiscus lapponicus
Dytiscus marginalis - great diving beetle
Dytiscus semisulcatus
Hydaticus continentalis
Hydaticus seminiger
Hydaticus transversalis
Bidessus minutissimus
Bidessus unistriatus
Hydroglyphus geminus
Deronectes latus
Graptodytes bilineatus
Graptodytes flavipes
Graptodytes granularis
Graptodytes pictus
Hydroporus angustatus
Hydroporus discretus
Hydroporus elongatulus
Hydroporus erythrocephalus
Hydroporus ferrugineus
Hydroporus glabriusculus
Hydroporus gyllenhalii
Hydroporus incognitus
Hydroporus longicornis
Hydroporus longulus
Hydroporus marginatus
Hydroporus melanarius
Hydroporus memnonius
Hydroporus morio
Hydroporus necopinatus
Hydroporus neglectus
Hydroporus nigrita
Hydroporus obscurus
Hydroporus obsoletus
Hydroporus palustris
Hydroporus planus
Hydroporus pubescens
Hydroporus rufifrons
Hydroporus scalesianus
Hydroporus striola
Hydroporus tessellatus
Hydroporus tristis
Hydroporus umbrosus
Nebrioporus assimilis
Nebrioporus depressus
Nebrioporus elegans
Nebrioporus canaliculatus
Oreodytes alpinus
Oreodytes davisii
Oreodytes sanmarkii
Oreodytes septentrionalis
Porhydrus lineatus
Scarodytes halensis
Stictonectes lepidus
Stictotarsus duodecimpustulatus
Stictotarsus multilineatus
Suphrodytes dorsalis
Hydrovatus clypealis
Hygrotus confluens
Hygrotus impressopunctatus
Hygrotus nigrolineatus
Hygrotus novemlineatus
Hygrotus parallelogrammus
Hygrotus decoratus
Hygrotus inaequalis
Hygrotus quinquelineatus
Hygrotus versicolor
Hyphydrus ovatus
Laccornis oblongus
Laccophilus hyalinus
Laccophilus minutus
Laccophilus poecilus

Suborder Polyphaga

Infraorder Elateriformia

Superfamily Byrrhoidea

Family Elmidae
 Elmis aenea
 Esolus parallelepipedus
 Limnius volckmari
 Macronychus quadrituberculatus
 Normandia nitens
 Oulimnius major
 Oulimnius rivularis
 Oulimnius troglodytes
 Oulimnius tuberculatus
 Riolus cupreus
 Riolus subviolaceus
 Stenelmis canaliculata

Family Dryopidae
 Pomatinus substriatus
 Dryops anglicanus
 Dryops auriculatus
 Dryops ernesti
 Dryops griseus
 Dryops luridus
 Dryops similaris
 Dryops striatellus
 Dryops nitidulus

Family Limnichidae
 Limnichus pygmaeus

Infraorder Staphyliniformia

Superfamily Hydrophiloidea

Family Helophoridae
 Helophorus nubilus
 Helophorus porculus
 Helophorus rufipes
 Helophorus tuberculatus
 Helophorus alternans
 Helophorus aequalis
 Helophorus grandis
 Helophorus arvernicus
 Helophorus brevipalpis
 Helophorus dorsalis
 Helophorus flavipes
 Helophorus fulgidicollis
 Helophorus granularis
 Helophorus griseus
 Helophorus laticollis
 Helophorus longitarsis
 Helophorus minutus
 Helophorus nanus
 Helophorus obscurus
 Helophorus strigifrons

Family Georissidae

 Georissus crenulatus

Family Hydrochidae
 Hydrochus angustatus
 Hydrochus brevis
 Hydrochus crenatus
 Hydrochus elongatus
 Hydrochus ignicollis
 Hydrochus megaphallus
 Hydrochus nitidicollis

Family Spercheidae

 Spercheus emarginatus

Family Hydrophilidae

Anacaena bipustulata
Anacaena globulus
Anacaena limbata
Anacaena lutescens
Paracymus aeneus
Paracymus scutellaris
Berosus affinis
Berosus luridus
Berosus signaticollis
Berosus fulvus
Chaetarthria seminulum
Chaetarthria simillima
Cymbiodyta marginellus
Enochrus affinis
Enochrus bicolor
Enochrus coarctatus
Enochrus fuscipennis
Enochrus halophilus
Enochrus melanocephalus
Enochrus nigritus
Enochrus ochropterus
Enochrus quadripunctatus
Enochrus testaceus
Helochares lividus
Helochares obscurus
Helochares punctatus
Hydrobius fuscipes
Limnoxenus niger
Hydrochara caraboides - lesser silver water beetle
Hydrophilus piceus - great silver water beetle
Laccobius atratus
Laccobius bipunctatus
Laccobius colon
Laccobius minutus
Laccobius obscuratus
Laccobius simulatrix
Laccobius sinuatus
Laccobius striatulus
Laccobius ytenensis
Coelostoma orbiculare
Dactylosternum abdominale
Cercyon alpinus
Cercyon bifenestratus
Cercyon convexiusculus
Cercyon depressus
Cercyon granarius
Cercyon haemorrhoidalis
Cercyon impressus
Cercyon laminatus
Cercyon lateralis
Cercyon littoralis
Cercyon marinus
Cercyon melanocephalus
Cercyon nigriceps
Cercyon obsoletus
Cercyon pygmaeus
Cercyon quisquilius
Cercyon sternalis
Cercyon terminatus
Cercyon tristis
Cercyon unipunctatus
Cercyon analis
Cercyon ustulatus
Megasternum concinnum
Cryptopleurum crenatum
Cryptopleurum minutum
Cryptopleurum subtile
Sphaeridium bipustulatum
Sphaeridium lunatum
Sphaeridium marginatum
Sphaeridium scarabaeoides

Superfamily Staphylinoidea

Family Hydraenidae

 Hydraena britteni
 Hydraena flavipes
 Hydraena gracilis
 Hydraena nigrita
 Hydraena palustris
 Hydraena pulchella
 Hydraena pygmaea
 Hydraena riparia
 Hydraena rufipes
 Hydraena testacea
 Limnebius aluta
 Limnebius crinifer
 Limnebius nitidus
 Limnebius papposus
 Limnebius truncatellus
 Enicocerus exsculptus
 Ochthebius auriculatus
 Ochthebius bicolon
 Ochthebius dilatatus
 Ochthebius aeneus
 Ochthebius lejolisii
 Ochthebius minimus
 Ochthebius difficilis
 Ochthebius nanus
 Ochthebius poweri
 Ochthebius punctatus
 Ochthebius lenensis
 Ochthebius marinus
 Ochthebius pusillus
 Ochthebius viridis
 Aulacochthebius exaratus

Water beetles